Bletsoe is a civil parish in Bedford, Bedfordshire, England. It contains 23 listed buildings that are recorded in the National Heritage List for England.  Of these, two are listed at Grade II*, the middle of the three grades, and the others are at Grade II, the lowest grade. The parish consists of large amounts of rural land, along with the village itself.  Almost all the listed buildings are houses and associated structures, farmhouses, and farm buildings.  Also listed are a church and a public house.

Key

Buildings

References

Lists of listed buildings in Bedfordshire
Listed buildings in the Borough of Bedford